Dorymyrmex morenoi is a species of ant in the genus Dorymyrmex. Described by Bruch in 1921, the species is endemic to Argentina.

References

Dorymyrmex
Hymenoptera of South America
Insects described in 1921